Alview-Dairyland Union School District is a school district headquartered in the campus of Dairyland Elementary School, located in Dairyland, an unincorporated community in Madera County, California, near Chowchilla. In addition to Dairyland Elementary, the district operates Alview Elementary School in the Alview community, also in unincorporated Madera County. Its attendance boundary includes rural areas in the county. It feeds into Chowchilla Union High School District, which operates Chowchilla Union High School.

It originated from a school opened in a private house in September 1915. Prior to the opening students attended school in Chowchilla. The community established a $2,500 bond to establish a two-room schoolhouse.

Schools
Alview School has one building which contains six classrooms. In 2015 Alview School had 177 students; it relies on a school well.

References

External links
 Alview-Dairyland Union School District
School districts in Madera County, California
1915 establishments in California
School districts established in 1915